Lisa Ann Sobecki (born June 30, 1967) is an American Democratic politician who currently serves as a member of the Ohio House of Representatives. Sobecki represents the 45th District, which includes portions of Lucas County. Sobecki is a former member of the Toledo Board of Education.

Ohio House of Representatives

Election
Sobecki was elected to her first term on November 6, 2018, winning 64% of the vote, compared to 36% for her Republican opponent David Davenport.

Committees
Sobecki serves on the following committees: Economic and Workforce Development, Primary and Secondary Education, State and Local Government, Ways and Means, and the Joint Education Oversight Committee.

Election history

References

Sobecki, Lisa
Living people
21st-century American politicians
21st-century American women politicians
Women state legislators in Ohio
1967 births
United States Navy officers